Habib Aghajari (born: in 1953, Bandar-e Mahshahr) is an Iranian Principlists representative of Bandar-e Mahshahr in the Islamic Consultative Assembly (Majles) who was elected at the 11th elections of the parliament as the first candidate for three cities of Mahshahr, Ramshir and Hendijan; and polled more than 30,000 votes --on 21 February 2020.

Among Habib-Aghajari's work records are as follows:

The representative of Mahshahr in the 9th period of the parliament; deputy commander of Islamic Revolutionary Guard Corps; a responsible in General Staff of the Armed Forces of the Islamic Republic of Iran; commander in some brigades, and so forth. He has a bachelor's degree in the subject of maritime science - navigation, computer science - software, and master's degree in defense - marine science. He has also a doctorate in defense science and national security.

See also 
 Seyyed Lefteh Ahmad Nejad
 Seyyed Mohammad Molavi
 Seyyed Mojtaba Mahfouzi
 Jalil Mokhtar
 Mohammad Tala Mazloumi

References 

Members of the Islamic Consultative Assembly by term
Members of the 9th Islamic Consultative Assembly
Members of the 11th Islamic Consultative Assembly
1953 births
Living people